The Kings of the Lombards or reges Langobardorum (singular rex Langobardorum) were the monarchs of the Lombard people from the early 6th century until the Lombardic identity became lost in the 9th and 10th centuries. After 774, they were not Lombards, but Franks. From the 12th century, the votive crown and reliquary known as the Iron Crown (Corona Ferrea) retrospectively became a symbol of their rule, though it was never used by Lombard kings.

The primary sources for the Lombard kings before the Frankish conquest are the anonymous 7th-century Origo Gentis Langobardorum and the 8th-century Historia Langobardorum of Paul the Deacon. The earliest kings (the pre-Lethings) listed in the Origo are almost certainly legendary. They purportedly reigned during the Migration Period. The first ruler attested independently of Lombard tradition is Tato.

Early rulers

Legendary rulers
Shava
Ybor and Agio, brothers, together with their mother Gambara, who led the emigration from Scandinavia
Agilmund, son of Agio
Laiamicho (Lamissio)
Ortnit

Lething Dynasty
The Lethings were an early dynasty from the time of Lethuc. The last ruling descendant of Lethuc was Walthari, whose son was in turn displaced by Audoin of the family of the Gausi.

Lethuc (fl. c. 400), ruled for some 40 years.
Aldihoc (mid-5th century)
Godehoc (480s), led the Lombards into modern-day Austria
Claffo (fl. c. 500)
Tato (early 6th century, died perhaps 510), his son Ildichus died in exile
Wacho (510–539), son of Unichus
Walthari (539–546), son of Wacho

Gausian Dynasty
Audoin (546–565), led the Lombards into Pannonia

Kings in Italy

Gausian Dynasty
Alboin (565–572)

Unnamed dynasty
Cleph (572–574)
Rule of the Dukes (Ten year interregnum)
Authari (584–590), son of previous
Agilulf (591–c. 616), cousin of previous

Bavarian Dynasty
Adaloald (c. 616–c. 626)

Non-dynastic king
Arioald (c. 626–636)

Harodingians
Rothari (636–652)
Rodoald (652–653)

Bavarian Dynasty, First Restoration
Aripert I (653–661)
Perctarit and Godepert (661–662)

Beneventan Dynasty
Grimuald (662–671)
Garibald (671)

Bavarian Dynasty, Second Restoration
Perctarit (671–688) (restored from exile)
Alahis (688–689), rebel
Cunincpert (688–700)
Liutpert (700–701)
Raginpert (701)
Aripert II (701–712)

Non-dynastic kings
Ansprand (712)
Liutprand (712–744)
Hildeprand (744)
Ratchis (744–749)
Aistulf (749–756)
Desiderius (756–774)

Carolingian Dynasty
Charlemagne conquered the Lombards in 774 at the invitation of Pope Adrian I.

Charlemagne (774–781) in personal union, passed kingship to his third son, Pepin.
Pepin (or Pippin) (781–810), king under authority of Charlemagne
Bernard (810–818)
Lothair I (818–839)
Louis II (839–875)

The title rex Langobardorum, synonymous with rex Italiae, lasted well into the High Middle Ages, but subsequent holders are found at King of Italy.

Family tree

Notes

Sources
 

Lombards Kings
 

de:Langobarden#Könige der Langobarden
et:Langobardid#Langobardide kuningate loend
ru:Лангобардское королевство#Короли лангобардов